Synaphea otiostigma is a shrub endemic to Western Australia.

The erect to decumbent small shrub typically that blooms between October and November producing yellow flowers.

It is found in the Wheatbelt and South West regions of Western Australia where it grows in clay-sandy-loamy soils over laterite.

References

Eudicots of Western Australia
otiostigma
Endemic flora of Western Australia
Plants described in 1995